Martina Satková (born 23 August 1998) is a Czech female wildwater and slalom canoeist who has competed at the international level since 2013.

In canoe slalom she won two gold medals in the C1 team event at the ICF Canoe Slalom World Championships (2021, 2022). She also won a silver and a bronze medal in the same event at the European Championships.

Satková also won 14 medals at senior level at the Wildwater Canoeing World Championships.

Her younger sister Gabriela is also a slalom canoeist.

World Cup individual podiums

Medals at the World Wildwater Championships
Senior

References

External links

1998 births
Living people
Czech female canoeists
Sportspeople from Brno
Medalists at the ICF Canoe Slalom World Championships